South Rourkela is an area of the steel city Rourkela in Orissa state, India.

Major inhabitations
The major inhabitations of South Rourkela are
Fertilizer Township
Jalda
Balijhudi(lower & upper)
Tangarpalli
I.D.L Colony/DesaiNagar
Nabakrushna Nagar
Utkal Nagar
Tarapur
Sonaparbat
Gopabandhu Nagar
Modern India
Construction Colony
Britannia Colony
Rehabilitation Colony
F.F. Colony
R.H. Colony
Auto Colony
Labour Colony
Jajabar colony
Deogaon
Dharamdihi
Bhanja Colony
Lokanath Market

Education

Schools
Ispat English Medium School
Pragati Public School
Ispat Lower Secondary School
Sonaparbat high school
Jalda High School

Neighbourhoods in Rourkela